Santa Fe de la Ribera was a fort constructed in 1602, by Alonso de Ribera at the confluence of the Biobio River and Vergara River, near the island of Diego Diaz. Its first garrison was two companies of soldiers, under the captains Francisco de Puebla and Alonso González de Nájera, who was in command of the place.

See also
 La Frontera (geographical region) of Chile

References

Sources 
 Crescente Errázuriz,  Seis años de la historia de Chile: 23 de diciembre de 1598 - 9 de abril de 1605: memoria histórica, Impr. Nacional, Santiago, 1881.

Colonial fortifications in Chile
Populated places established in 1602
Geography of Biobío Region
1602 establishments in the Spanish Empire